Harry H. Corbett OBE (28 February 1925 – 21 March 1982) was an English actor and comedian, best remembered for playing rag-and-bone man Harold Steptoe alongside Wilfrid Brambell in the long-running BBC television sitcom Steptoe and Son (1962–65, 1970–74). His success on television led to appearances in comedy films including The Bargee (1964), Carry On Screaming! (1966) and Jabberwocky (1977).

Early life
Corbett was born on 28 February 1925, the youngest of seven children, in Rangoon, Burma, (now Myanmar) where his father, George Corbett (1885/86–1943), was serving as a company quartermaster sergeant in the South Staffordshire Regiment of the British Army, stationed at a cantonment as part of the Colonial defence forces. Corbett was sent to Britain after his mother, Caroline Emily, née Barnsley, (1884–1926) died of dysentery when he was eighteen months old. He was then brought up by his aunt, Annie Williams, in Earl Street, Ardwick, Manchester and later on a new council estate in Wythenshawe. He attended Ross Place and Benchill Primary Schools; although he passed the scholarship exam for entry to Chorlton Grammar School, he was not able to take up his place there and instead attended Sharston Secondary School.

Corbett enlisted in the Royal Marines during the Second World War, and served in the Home Fleet on the heavy cruiser HMS Devonshire. After VJ Day in 1945, he was posted to the Far East, where he was involved in quelling unrest in New Guinea and reportedly killed two Japanese soldiers there whilst engaged in hand-to-hand fighting. He was then posted to Tonga, but deserted and remained in Australia before handing himself in to the Military Police. His military service left him with a damaged bladder following an infection, and a red mark on his eye caused by a thorn, which was not treated until late in his life.

Career
Upon returning to civilian life, Corbett trained as a radiographer before taking up acting as a career, joining the Chorlton Repertory theatre. In the early 1950s, he added the initial "H" to avoid confusion with the television entertainer Harry Corbett, known for his act with the glove-puppet Sooty. He joked that "H" stood for "hennyfink", a Cockney pronunciation of "anything". In 1956, he appeared on stage in The Family Reunion at the Phoenix Theatre in London.

From 1958, Corbett began to appear regularly in films, coming to public attention as a serious, intense performer, in contrast to his later reputation in sitcom. He appeared in television dramas such as The Adventures of Robin Hood  (as four characters in episodes between 1957 and 1960) and Police Surgeon (1960). He also worked and studied Stanislavski's system at Joan Littlewood's Theatre Workshop at the Theatre Royal in Stratford, London.

In 1962, scriptwriters Galton and Simpson, who had been successful with Hancock's Half Hour, invited Corbett to appear in "The Offer", an episode of the BBC's anthology series of one-off comedy plays, Comedy Playhouse, written by Galton and Simpson. He played Harold Steptoe, a rag-and-bone man who lives with his irascible widower father, Albert (Wilfrid Brambell) in a dilapidated house attached to their junkyard and stable for their cart horse, Hercules. At the time, Corbett was working at the Bristol Old Vic, where he appeared as Macbeth.

The programme was a success and a full series followed, continuing, with breaks, until 1974, when the Christmas special became the final episode. Although the popularity of Steptoe and Son made Corbett a star, it damaged his serious acting career, as he became irreversibly associated with Steptoe in the public eye. As a result, severe typecasting forced him to come back to the role of Harold Steptoe over and over. Before the series began, Corbett had played Shakespeare's Richard II to great acclaim; however, when he played Hamlet in 1970, he felt both critics and audiences alike were not taking him seriously and could only see him as Steptoe. Corbett found himself receiving offers only for bawdy comedies or loose parodies of Steptoe.

Production of the sitcom was stressful in the last few years, as Brambell was an alcoholic, often ill-prepared for rehearsals and forgetting his lines and movements. A tour of a Steptoe and Son stage production in Australia in 1977 proved a disaster due to Brambell's drinking. 

The television episodes were remade for radio, often with the original cast; it is these that were made available on cassette and CD. After the series of Steptoe and Son had officially finished, Corbett and Brambell played the characters again on radio (in a newly written sketch to tie in with the Scottish team's participation in the 1978 World Cup), as well as in a television commercial for Kenco coffee.  The two men reunited in January 1981 for one final performance as Steptoe and Son in a further commercial for Kenco.

Other work
Steptoe and Son led Corbett to comedy films: as James Ryder in Ladies Who Do (1963); with Ronnie Barker in The Bargee (1964), written by Galton and Simpson; Carry On Screaming! (1966); the "Lust" segment of The Magnificent Seven Deadly Sins (1971); and Terry Gilliam's Jabberwocky (1977). There were two Steptoe and Son films: Steptoe and Son (1972) and Steptoe and Son Ride Again (1973). In 1966 he appeared as a narrator in four episodes of the BBC children's television series Jackanory, and he also had the leading role in two other television series, Mr. Aitch (written especially for him, 1967) and Grundy (1980). Corbett had a supporting role in the David Essex film Silver Dream Racer (1980), and also appeared in the film Hardcore (1977). In addition, he had a supporting role in Potter (1980) with Arthur Lowe on the BBC.

Corbett recorded multiple 45rpm records, most of which were novelty songs based upon the rag-and-bone character, including "Harry, You Love Her" and "Junk Shop". He recorded a number of sea shanties and folk songs. In 1973, he recorded an album titled Only Authorised Employees To Break Bottles which was a "showcase of accents", with songs from Corbett in a range of accents, including Liverpudlian, Brummie and Mancunian; the title echoes a notice which is visible in the bottle-smashing scene in the film 'The Bargee'. The album was recorded in 1973 and released in 1974 on the Torquay, Devon-based RA record label with support from seventies folk band 'Faraway Folk': RALP  Including the album, he released over 30 songs.

Personal life
Corbett married twice, first to the actress Sheila Steafel (from 1958 to 1964), and then to actress Maureen Blott (stage name Crombie) (from 1969 to 1982), with whom he had two children, Jonathan and Susannah. Susannah is an actress and author, and has written a biography of her father, Harry H. Corbett: The Front Legs of the Cow, which was published in March 2012. Steafel published her autobiography When Harry Met Sheila in 2010.

Politics
Corbett was a Labour Party campaigner, and once appeared in a party political broadcast, and was a guest of Prime Minister Harold Wilson. The television character Harold Steptoe appears as the Labour Party secretary for Shepherd's Bush West in the sixth series episode, "Tea for Two". In 1969, Corbett appeared as Harold Steptoe in a Labour Party political broadcast, where Bob Mellish had to argue against Steptoe's accusation that all parties are the same. 

As Prime Minister, Wilson wished to have Corbett appointed an Officer of the Order of the British Empire (OBE), but the middle initial "H" was lost in the process and the award went to the Sooty puppeteer, Harry Corbett, instead. Both were eventually included in the same 1976 New Year Honours.

Health problems and death
A heavy smoker all his adult life, Corbett had his first heart attack in September 1979. According to his daughter, Suzannah, he smoked 60 cigarettes a day until the heart attack, after which he cut down to 20. He appeared in pantomime at the Churchill Theatre, Bromley, within two days of leaving hospital. He was then badly hurt in a car accident. He appeared shortly afterwards in the BBC detective series Shoestring, his facial injuries obvious. Other work included the film Silver Dream Racer, with David Essex, and a Thames Television/ITV comedy series Grundy, both in 1980. In the latter, Corbett played an old man discovering the permissive society after a lifetime of clean living. 

Corbett's final role was an episode of the Anglia Television/ITV series Tales of the Unexpected, entitled "The Moles". Filmed shortly before his death, it was broadcast two months later, in May 1982.

Corbett died of a heart attack on 21 March 1982, in Hastings, East Sussex. He was 57 years old. He is buried in the graveyard at St Michael the Archangel church at Penhurst, East Sussex. The headstone inscription, chosen by his wife Maureen, reads "The earth can have but earth, which is his due: My spirit is thine, the better part of me", from William Shakespeare's Sonnet 74. Maureen was buried alongside him in 1999. Corbett is commemorated in the name of the Corbett Theatre at the East 15 Acting School at Loughton.

Selected filmography

References

External links
 
 
 Harry H. Corbett Heaven
 

1925 births
1982 deaths
20th-century English comedians
20th-century English male actors
Best Actor BAFTA Award (television) winners
English male comedians
British male comedy actors
English male film actors
English male television actors
English male stage actors
Freemasons of the United Grand Lodge of England
Labour Party (UK) people
Male actors from Manchester
Officers of the Order of the British Empire
People from Yangon
People from Wythenshawe
Royal Marines personnel of World War II